Neodesha is an unincorporated community in Wagoner County, Oklahoma, United States. It was founded by C. R. White, a former resident of Neodesha, Kansas. The name is derived from the Osage Indian word, Ni-o-sho-de, and is translated as The-Water-Is-Smoky-With-Mud.

Geography
Neodesha is located at latitude 36.046 and longitude -95.434. Its elevation is 610 feet.

References

Unincorporated communities in Oklahoma
Unincorporated communities in Wagoner County, Oklahoma